is a former Japanese football player and manager.

Playing career
Tsukada was born in Kofu on December 28, 1957. After graduating from Nippon Sport Science University, he played for his local club Kofu SC (later Ventforet Kofu) from 1980 to 1989.

Coaching career
After retirement, in 1995 Tsukada became a manager for Japan Football League clubVentforet Kofu. In 1999, the club joined new league J2 League. However, he didn't have a coaching license for J2 League. So, former manager Susumu Katsumata became a manager to replace Tsukada. In 1999, Tsukada got a coaching license and came back as a manager in 2000. In 2002, he became an assistant coach for Cerezo Osaka. In October 2003, he became a manager to replace Akihiro Nishimura and he led to finalist at 2003 Emperor's Cup. He also managed the club in 2006 to replace Shinji Kobayashi.

Managerial statistics

References

External links

1957 births
Living people
Nippon Sport Science University alumni
Association football people from Yamanashi Prefecture
Japanese footballers
Japan Soccer League players
Ventforet Kofu players
Japanese football managers
J1 League managers
J2 League managers
Ventforet Kofu managers
Cerezo Osaka managers
Association football midfielders